Condor Ferries is an operator of passenger and freight ferry services between The United Kingdom, Bailiwick of Guernsey, Bailiwick of Jersey and France.

Corporate history

Condor Ferries established the first high-speed car ferry service to the Channel Islands from Weymouth in 1993 using the 74m Incat catamaran Condor 10.  In the winter of 1993/1994, Condor's parent company, Commodore Shipping, took over British Channel Island Ferries (BCIF) which operated conventional ferry services to the Channel Islands from Poole. Upon taking over BCIF, Condor moved all passenger services to Weymouth and the BCIF freight service was transferred to Commodore Shipping. The BCIF vessel Havelet ran a conventional ferry service from Weymouth from 1994 alongside the Condor 10.

New UK bases, purchase of the Havelet and Condor Vitesse 
In March 1997, Condor moved its UK port to Poole. The Condor Express suffered technical problems that led to late-running services. As a result, the Channel Island governments put the licence to operate ferry services to the UK out to tender. P&O European Ferries and Hoverspeed submitted bids to run the service but ultimately Condor retained the licence but was forced to purchase the Havelet to act as an all-weather back-up until the delivery of a new conventional vessel in 1999.  It also purchased the Condor Vitesse for a new service to St Malo via Guernsey and made Weymouth its primary UK port, though retaining summer sailings from Poole. Commodore Shipping became sole owner of the company around this time.

As part of the Condor Liberation purchase, the Condor Vitesse has been sold to a Greek ferry company, along with her sister Condor Express.

Introduction of Condor 10, management buy-out, rebranding and sale 
Condor 10 returned to the fleet in March 2002 to replace the Condor 9 on the St Malo – Channel Island service and to fully compete with the existing fast car ferry service of Emeraude Lines. Later that year, the Commodore Group, which included Condor Ferries, Commodore Ferries and Commodore Express, was sold to a management buy-out team for a reported £150 million. The deal was backed by ABN AMRO. Shortly after, the Condor Ferries logo was redesigned for the start of the 2003 season using the same font as the logo Brittany Ferries had adopted in 2002. In 2004, the group was rebranded with Commodore Ferries coming under the Condor Ferries name and Commodore Express becoming Condor Logistics. The group was sold once again in 2004 to the Royal Bank of Scotland's venture capital arm for £240 million.

Acquisition by the Macquarie Group 
In 2008, the Macquarie European Infrastructure Fund II acquired the Condor Group.

Closure of Condor Logistics 
It was announced on 4 October 2012 that Condor Logistics would close its operations with the loss of about 180 jobs (110 in the UK, 50 in Jersey and 20 in Guernsey). The move was blamed on changes to low-value consignment relief affecting the Channel Islands.

Brittany Ferries partnership 
In 2001, Condor started operating a Poole – Cherbourg fastcraft service on behalf of Brittany Ferries using the Condor Vitesse which sported a joint livery. The service ran between mid-May and late October, leaving Poole at 07:30 and arriving back from Cherbourg at 12:45. Condor Vitesse then operated the Condor service to St Malo arriving back in Poole by midnight.

In August 2005, Condor Express briefly ran on the Poole – Cherbourg service. The Condor Express had been experiencing technical problems and so the Condor Vitesse was transferred to the more taxing Channel Islands service. Condor Express also operated the Poole-Cherbourg route in 2008.

It was announced on Thursday 14 November 2019 that Brittany Ferries and Columbia Threadneedle had bought Condor as it was up for sale.

Operations
Condor Ferries operate the following routes:
Poole – Guernsey – Jersey (Condor Liberation) 
Poole – Guernsey – Cherbourg (Condor Liberation)
Portsmouth – Guernsey – Jersey (Commodore Clipper, Commodore Goodwill)
Jersey and Guernsey – St Malo (Condor Voyager)
Portsmouth – Guernsey – Jersey – St Malo (Commodore Clipper)

Current fleet
The fleet is as follows.

Commodore Clipper 

In 1999, Commodore Clipper (IMO9201750) was delivered to Commodore Ferries and replaced a freight ferry Island Commodore. The new Commodore Clipper was able to replace Havelet as all-weather back-up for the fast craft as she had space for 500 passengers.

HSC Condor Liberation 

HSC Condor Liberation entered service between Poole and the Channel Islands on Friday 27 March 2015.

On 30 April 2015 the Jersey-born film star Henry Cavill was allowed to briefly steer Condor Liberation.

Teething problems
Condor Liberation had a number of cancelled sailings in her first weeks of service due to technical problems and adverse weather conditions:

On 28 March 2015, the ferry's second day in service, while attempting to turn in St Peter Port harbour, the ship struck the quay, sustaining minor damage. The ship remained out of service for a week.
On its return to service the ship developed an electrical fault in its engines, and was forced to run at reduced speed, resulting in service cancellations.
On 11 April 2015 the ferry was unable to load 24 cars and 60 passengers at Jersey due to a combination of late running and an issue with a section of hoistable deck.
On 9 May 2015 which is the Channel Island's Liberation Day the ship did not sail in the morning (one of two sailings scheduled for the day) due to the failure of one of her bow thrusters.
In May 2015, Condor admitted that 10% of ferry crossings had not run at all, and only 60% of those that had had run to schedule. A review into the suitability of the ship was commissioned. 
On 24 August 2015 the ferry was unable to dock in St Peter Port. Condor stated that another vessel was impeding safe access, and the ship continued to Poole.
On 19 and 22 September 2015 the ferry's sailings were cancelled due to repairs being carried out to her exhaust system.
On 29 and 30 October 2015 the ferry's sailings were cancelled due to repair work.
On 23 November 2015 the ferry's sailing was cancelled due to an electrical fault.
On 31 December 2015 the ferry was damaged whilst moored in Poole Harbour and sailings were cancelled. The ferry was taken out of service for two months
On its blog set up to promote the new ferry in the months before it entered service, Condor said that they expected the new ship's 'more stable design' would enable it to sail in considerably higher seas and to significantly reduce the number of weather-related cancellations. The ship is currently permitted to sail in a significant wave height of up to 3.5 metres.

Concerns over suitability for the route
Speculation amongst the public that Condor Liberation was "at risk of capsizing in anything but the calmest weather" resulted in the publishing of an independent report by Houlder Limited which concluded that the maximum level of heel measured during wave rolling could be disconcerting to passengers but posed no threat to the safety of the vessel. The investigators were on board in a near gale when the significant wave height was 3 metres and short waves were breaking directly on the beam. The maximum heel recorded was 15.5° from horizontal. Rolling is less frequent than experienced in the same sea conditions on the earlier catamarans but the angle of heel is greater.

Company press statements indicate issues regarding punctuality of the latest vessel purely relate to procedures regarding loading and unloading, and are not related to stability or the safety of the ship. This view was confirmed in the Houlder report which found that sailing in poor weather had little effect on the journey time.

The BBC reported on 11 June 2015 that Condor said they would "urge the public to refrain from intimidation" due to complaints being circulated on social media regarding members of staff. This has, in turn led to questions being raised in regards to whether or not the company has appropriately investigated these complaints, again highlighted on social media.

Commenting on news that Condor were commissioning an independent report on the suitability of Condor Liberation, Jersey's Minister for Economic Development, Senator Lyndon Farnham welcomed the move, which will be funded by the ferry company. He said: "I hope that this report will help us to draw a line under ill-informed speculation about the ship, which is not only damaging Condor Ferries' business but could potentially impact our Islands' reputation."

On 18 September 2015 Senator Farnham and Deputy Kevin Stewart, chairman of Guernsey's External Transport Group called for an urgent review of the service level agreement between the States and Condor.  Senator Farnham subsequently commented that the Condor fleet was "clearly not up to the job" and criticized Condor's contingency plans and customer service.

Houlder Limited's independent report published on 15 October 2015 also considered the reliability and ride comfort of Condor Liberation, concluding that the ship is suitable for operation in the English Channel.

HSC Condor Voyager 

HSC Condor Voyager entered service in the early summer of 2021. Previously known as Normandie Express, she came into service as a replacement for Condor Rapide. Voyager is owned by Brittany Ferries who are leasing it to Condor.

Future fleet
Condor will use the Artemis eFoiler on a route between Belfast and Bangor from 2024. The eFoiler is an electric hydrofoiling boat.

Past fleet

Condors 1 to 7
The initial series of Condor ferries were all hydrofoil passenger ferries, with the exception of Condor 6 which was a passenger only catamaran.

Havelet

Built in 1977 in Norway for Brittany Ferries for their Plymouth to Roscoff route, and originally named Cornouailles, she was transferred to British Channel Island Ferries in 1989 and renamed Havelet. She was powered by two 16 cylinder Pielstick PA6V280 diesels of 5,600bhp each. Condor purchased BCIF in 1994 and Havelet was used to operate a conventional service from Weymouth until 1996 when she was laid up as it was thought that Condor Express would be able to handle the winter weather. Condor was forced to reactivate and purchase the Havelet in 1998 prior to the arrivial of Commodore Clipper to act as back up for the fastcraft.

Sale
Havelet was sold in 2000 to Montenegro Lines where she was renamed the Sveti Stefan and sailed between Bari and Bar until April 2013 when she sailed to Aliağa, Turkey to be broken up.

Condor 8
Passenger only catamaran, built in Singapore by Fairey Marinteknik. Powered by two MTU 16V396 diesels, waterjet propulsion.

Sale
Condor 8 was renamed Waterways 1. She was sold again in January 2000, to SNAV. Her new owner changed her name to SNAV Aries, and introduced her on a route linking Anzio and Ponza, in Italy.

Condor 9

Fast passenger-only catamaran. Built in 1990 in Fareham by Aluminium Shipsbuilders to an Incat design. IMO8906717. She was powered by four 16 cylinder Deutz MWM high speed diesel engines of 2,256bhp each, driving MJP waterjets.
Built for the Weymouth – Channel Islands route but was replaced by Condor 10. Condor 9 saw work on the inter-island routes and between the Channel Islands and St Malo. Summer 1994, she was chartered to Viking Lines on the Helsinki to Tallinn route. From October 1994 to May 1995, she operated as 'Sun Island Jet Express' between Trinidad and Tobago. For the 1995 and 1996 season, Condor 9 operated from Torquay to the Islands. In 1997, she operated between Poole and St Malo via the Channel Islands. In her last years with Condor she was used between St Malo and Jersey until she was again replaced by Condor 10.

Sale
Condor 9 was sold to Stetson Navigation as the Cortez, and used in the Sea of Cortez. After suffering from an engine fire, she was sold in 2004 to a Connecticut-based company Block Island Ferry Services, LLC d/b/a Block Island Express and was renamed the Jessica W. She is now currently used to transport (mostly) tourists to Block Island, a well known New England travel destination 14 miles off the coast of Rhode Island.

In 2014 she was re-engined with four new 
12-cyl Caterpillar 3512C diesels.

Condor 10

Condor 10 was built 1993 and was in service with Condor between 1993-1994 and again between 2002 and 2011. She was sold in September 2011 to a South Korean Company and renamed Hanil Blue Narae.
IMO9001526.

Condor 11

Incat 78m catamaran was brought into service in March 1995 and used for less than one season on the Weymouth – Channel Islands route. Between March and May 1995, the Weymouth service was operated by the chartered Seacat Isle of Man. The Condor 11 finally entered service on 18 May 1995. She was used for one season on the route before being redeployed to Cat-Link in Denmark. She is currently known as Fares 2 and sails the Red Sea.

Condor 12

Incat 81m catamaran which operated for the 1996 season between Weymouth and the Channel Islands. She was sent to Holyman Sally Ferries in 1997 as the Holyman Rapide. She briefly returned to Condor as the Rapide to cover for the refit of the Condor Express in early 1998.

Sale
Condor 12 was redeployed to Holyman's new Ramsgate – Ostend service and renamed Holyman Rapide. In June 2006 Rapide left the channel probably for the last time bound for a new career in the Mediterranean with Balearia Ferries, renamed Jaume II.
IMO9116113.

Condor Express

In 1997, Condor 12 and Havelet places on the Channel Island route were taken by another Incat, this time an 86m design which was named Condor Express.

As part of the Condor Liberation purchase, Condor Express was sold to a Greek ferry company Seajets.  She remained on standby with Condor Ferries until the successful introduction of Condor Liberation on the Channel Islands-to-UK route. The Express was very reluctantly put back into service with a very limited service after the Liberation'''s accident, and departed for the Greek islands in 2015. Her new name is Champion Jet 2.
IMO9135896.

Condor Vitesse

On 14 January 2015, a deal was announced between Condor Ferries and Greek ferry firm Seajets for the sale of both the Condor Express and Condor Vitesse for an undisclosed sum (internal company rumours are €9 million), with the plan being for both vessels to be replaced by the new Condor Liberation. The company said the Vitesse would be delivered to its new owner at the end of February. Her new name is Champion Jet 1.
IMO9151008.

Condor Rapide

It was announced on 8 July 2021 that the Rapide had been sold to a Spanish ferry company Transmapi. 
The Condor Voyager has replaced the RapideRegistration
The vessels of Condor's fleet  are all registered in the Bahamas. In the past, some vessels were registered in Cyprus.

Incidents with HD Ferries
On 11 May 2007 HD Ferries' ship HD1 had collided with the Commodore Goodwill in Jersey Harbour.

A more serious incident occurred on 28 July 2007 when HD1, while manoeuvring in Jersey Harbour, collided with Condor Express which was berthed at the time.  HD1 was holed above the waterline while Condor Express suffered only minor damage to its paintwork.

Condor issued a press release on 3 August 2007 condemning HD Ferries, which HD responded to with its own press release.  HD1 later had its wave height limit reduced from 2.5 metres to 2m (Condor being able to operate its larger fastcraft in seas up to 3.5 metres), and on 19 August 2007 the HD Ferries ramp permit for Jersey and Guernsey was withdrawn, preventing the company from operating. It recommenced operations on 25 August 2007.

In a press release issued on 2 October 2007, HD Ferries stated that it was preparing to take legal action against Condor concerning the statement published by the company on 3 August 2007, but this was not done.

Following HD Ferries' decision to withdraw its service early in September 2008 and not operate a winter service, the States of Jersey indicated that HD Ferries was unlikely to be allowed a ramp licence again.

 Collisions and groundings 

 Condor 11 
On 9 October 1994 Condor 11 was on sea trials off Tasmania and travelling at 36 knots under the command of Incat managing director Robert Clifford when she struck Black Jack Reef some 12 miles off Hobart.

 Commodore Goodwill collision with harbour wall 
On 10 December 2007, bad weather caused the Commodore Goodwill to strike the entrance to La Collette yacht basin in St Helier harbour. One of the vessel's propellers was damaged and the ship was sent to Falmouth for the damaged part to be removed to return the ship to service as soon as possible in the run-up to Christmas. On 13 December 2007, the Brittany Ferries freight vessel Coutances was chartered to temporarily take the Commodore Goodwill's place.

 Condor Vitesse collision with a French fishing boat 
At approximately 0645 UTC on 28 March 2011 the Condor Vitesse was in collision with a Granville fishing boat, the 9.3m Les Marquises, in the vicinity of the Minquiers reef south of Jersey while en route from St Malo in foggy conditions.  Two of the French fishermen were rescued from the water by the ferry's safety boats.  The skipper of Les Marquises, 42-year-old Philippe Claude Lesaulnier, was rescued by another fishing boat Joker and transferred to Jersey's lifeboat, but died later the same day in Jersey's hospital. An inquest in Jersey revealed that Monsieur Lesaulnier died of crush injuries to the upper abdomen, and drowning. He leaves a wife and four children.

An investigation began. The French investigator, Renauld Gaudeul, procureur de la République de Coutances said that the speed of the ferry would be of key importance to the investigation. On 19 October 2011, the BEAmer released its report. In summary, "Condor Vitesse sailed from Saint-Malo in thick fog conditions; the fog horn had been inactivated very early and the visual lookout had not been strengthened. The speed had progressively reached 37 knots. In the wheelhouse almost continuous talks without any link with the watchkeeping, maintained an atmosphere not compatible with the necessary concentration to conduct a HSC in the fog. This behavior, as well as the visibility are the causal factors of the accident. When Condor Vitesse approached the Minquiers waters, both officers did not detect 2 vessel echoes ahead on starboard, the first was a ship that would be passing at a hundred of meters on starboard, the second was Les Marquises. The potter was fishing, with her radar on, without emitting any sound signals. A hand saw the HSC at the last moment but too late to alert the skipper. The collision cut the fishing vessel in two parts, while on board the HSC there was a leak in the starboard bow compartment. The aft part of the potter kept afloat for a time, allowing the two hands to stay on it until they have been rescued by the HSC crew."On 11 September 2013 the court in Coutances found the Vitesse captain Paul Le Romancer and first officer Yves Tournon (both of whom no longer work for Condor) guilty of manslaughter, involuntary injury and failure to respect maritime regulations. Tournon was later exonerated by the Caen appeal court, which quashed his conviction.

 Commodore Clipper grounding 

On 14 July 2014, Commodore Clipper accidentally grounded off Guernsey. The key findings of an investigation by Marine Accident Investigation Branch were:

 There had not been enough planning for the trip – in part because the repetitive nature of the schedule had led to "complacency".
 The crew refused to acknowledge that the ship might have grounded, partly because the alarms that could have told them it had been disabled
 Insufficient passage planning meant that the bridge team headed into danger without appreciation of the navigational risk. The planning issues not properly considered were: the very low tide, the effect of the ship 'squatting' in shallow water at high speed and the accuracy of the chart data. 
 The possibility that the vessel had grounded was denied. In the circumstances of a shuddering vibration, it is important that the crew establish the state of their vessel by searching for damage. 
 The repetitive nature of ferry operations can induce a degree of complacency when planning. 
 The electronic navigation system was not being utilised effectively because safety settings were not appropriate to the local conditions, warnings were ignored and the audible alarm was disabled. 
 As the responsible authority, Guernsey Harbours did not have an effective risk assessment or safety management plan for the conduct of navigation in its statutory pilotage area.

Condor Ferries says it entirely accepts the findings of its detailed and thorough report.

 Condor Liberation berthing collision 
On 28 March 2015, the day after Condor Liberation entered service, she was blown onto the quayside in Guernsey and had to be taken out of service and returned to Poole for repairs. All passengers had to wait in Guernsey for the Commodore Clipper to arrive to take them to Portsmouth instead of Poole.

 Commodore Goodwill collision with a fishing boat 
On 8 December 2022, the Commodore Goodwill had departed from Guernsey at 04:41 bound for Jersey when at around 05:30 it collided with the L'Ecume II, an  fishing trawler. The skipper of the L'Ecume II Michael Michieli and his two Filipino crewmen Larry Simyunn and Jervis Baligat were searched for, unsuccessfully; by 13 December two bodies had been found and were later brought ashore, with the search continuing. After inspection by divers the Commodore Goodwill was cleared to re-enter service. An investigation was started, with a remotely operated underwater vehicle used to survey the shipwreck. As Commodore Goodwill'' is registered in the Bahamas, the Bahamas Maritime Authority is responsible for conducting a safety focused investigation.

References

Notes

Bibliography

External links
 Official Condor Ferries website
 HSC Jessica W on Vessel Finder

Ferry companies of Guernsey
Ferry companies of Jersey
Ferry companies of England
Ferry companies of France
Connections across the English Channel
Transport in Dorset
Transport in Normandy
Transport in Brittany
Transport companies established in 1964
1964 establishments in Guernsey